This page lists the members of Los Angeles City College, including students, alumni, faculty and academic affiliates associated.

Alumni

Economics
 Lawrence Klein, economist, Nobel Prize recipient in Economics (deceased)

Communications
 Pete Arbogast, radio announcer
 Murray Fromson, broadcast journalist
 Paul Olden, radio announcer
 Ted Sobel, sports journalist
Don Sainte-Johnn (Wilber Johnson)

Education
 Maulana Karenga, professor of Black Studies, activist and founder of Kwanzaa
 Margaret Martin, Harmony Project Founder and Recipient of President's Citizens Medal

Entertainment

Performance

Rene Michelle Aranda, actress
Bob Arbogast, radio broadcaster and voice actor
 Alan Arkin, actor, Academy Award ® recipient
 Billy Barty, actor and founder, Little People of America
 Brenda Benet, actress
 Barbara Billingsley, actor
 Tommy Bond, actor
 Sufe Bradshaw, actress
 Albert Brooks, actor, comedian and director
 Charles D. Brooks III, actor, director and playwright
 Diana Canova, actor
 Ralph Carter, actor
 Dean Chekvala, actor
 James Coburn, actor, Academy Award ® recipient
 Angela Dorian, actress and model
 Clint Eastwood, actor; producer, Academy Award ® recipient; director
Christine Elise, actress, author, writer, producer
 Mike Evans, actor
 Laurence Fishburne, actor
 Al Freeman, Jr., actor, Emmy ®
 Morgan Freeman, actor, Academy Award® recipient;
 Don Grady, actor on TV's My Three Sons
 Debbie Shapiro Gravitte, actor, Tony Award ® recipient
 Deidre Hall, actor
 Mark Hamill, actor
 Earl Hammond, actor, voice actor
 Linda Hart, actor
 Alex Henteloff, actor
 Allen Hoskins, actor
 Jackie Joseph, actor
 Aron Kader, comedian
 Celia Kaye, actress
 Margaret Kerry, actor
 Sally Kellerman, actor, Academy Award® nominee
 Shin Koyamada, actor, producer, Founder of Koyamada International Foundation
 Wallace Langham, actor
 Ruta Lee, actor
 Elliott Lewis, actor, director and producer in old-time radio
 Whitman Mayo, actor
 Angela McEwan, actor
 James Mitchell, actor and dancer
 Dickie Moore, actor
 Wayne Morris, actor, WWII ace
 Shelley Morrison, actor
 Stephen Nichols, actor
 Jeanette Nolan, actor
 Hugh O'Brian, actor, Golden Globe Award ® recipient
 Edward Padilla, actor
 Rosie Perez, actor and choreographer
 Donna Reed, actor, Academy Award ® recipient
 Maggie Roswell, actor
 Wendy Schaal, actress
 Alexis Smith, actor, Tony Award ® recipient
 Mila del Sol, Philippine actress, entrepreneur, civic-leader, philanthropist
 Louise Sorel, actor
 Joseph Stern, actor
 Roy Thinnes, actor
 Irene Tsu, actress
 Robert Vaughn, actor, Emmy ® Award recipient
 David White, actor; played Larry Tate on the Bewitched TV series
 Stuart Whitman, actor
 Cindy Williams, actor and producer
 Esther Williams, actor, Golden Globe Award ® recipient
 Mykelti Williamson, actor
 Paul Winfield, actor, Emmy ® Award recipient
 Jo Anne Worley, actor
 Tony Young, actor

Production
 Ray Aghayan, costume designer, Emmy ® Award recipient
 Rudy Behlmer, director and author
 True Boardman, screenwriter and actor
 Dan Bootzin, film editor, Emmy ® Award recipient
 Lee Broda, producer
 Zev Buffman, Broadway producer
 Charles Burnett, director and writer
 Charles Campbell, sound engineer, Academy Award ® recipient
 Tamra Davis, filmmaker
 Victor DuBois, editor, Emmy ® Award nominee
 Ron Ellis, Academy Award-winning filmmaker
 Robert Elswit, cinematographer, Academy Award ® recipient
 F. Gary Gray, director and producer
 Maggie Greenwald, director and writer
 Nick Grippo, caterer and author
 Ray Harryhausen, producer, director and special effects artist; special Academy Award ® recipient
 Albert Hughes, director, producer, screenwriter
 Bruce Kimmel, director, producer, writer, actor and composer
 Mimi Leder, director, Emmy ® Award recipient
 Michael Lembeck, director, Emmy ® Award recipient; actor
 William McCloud, camera operator, Emmy ® Award recipient
 John Milius, screenwriter, producer and director
 Karen Moncrieff, director
 Sharon Oreck, producer and author
 Gene Roddenberry, producer and screenwriter
 Robert J. Sexton, producer, director, writer, and former musician
 Tarsem Singh, director
 Gary Stockdale, composer for television shows
 Kevin Tent, editor, Academy Award ® nominee
 José Quintero, director

Fine arts

Art
 Roberto Esteban Chavez artist, known for his personally symbolic portraits, public murals
 Don Bachardy, artist
 Billy Al Bengston, painter and sculptor
 Dianne Dillon, illustrator
 Melvin Edwards, sculptor
 Cristian Gheorghiu, contemporary artist/painter
 Doyle Lane, ceramist
 Jason Laure, photographer and author
 John Lees, artist and painter
 Daniel Marlos, LACC Visual & Media Arts Vice Chair
 Kerry James Marshall, artist
 Evangeline Montgomery, print-maker, metal smith and weaver
 Ruth Orkin, photographer and filmmaker
 John Riddle, commercial artist, sculptor and painter
 Hisako Terasaki, artist and etcher
 H.C. Westermann, printmaker and sculptor
 Robert Williams, painter and cartoonist
8*

Dance

 Alvin Ailey, dancer and choreographer
 Janet Collins, ballerina

Design

 Lester Oliver Bankhead, architect
 Frank Gehry, architect, Pritzker Architecture Prize recipient
 Rudi Gernreich, fashion designer

Music
 David Alpert, musician
 Roy Ayers, jazz musician
 Chet Baker, trumpeter and vocalist
 Robert Bradley, blues musician
 Pamela Courson, singer, Jim Morrison's girlfriend
 Herb Geller, jazz musician
 M.C. Hammer, aka Stanley K. Burrell, R&B musician
 Jose “Pepe” Carlos, accordionist and requinto, Grammy ® recipient
 Eric Dolphy, jazz musician
 Jean Fenn, opera singer
 Bob Florence, composer, band leader and educator
 Don Friedman, jazz pianist
 Jerry Goldsmith, composer, Academy Award ® recipient
 DJ Irene, aka Irene M. Gutiérrez, electronic music DJ
 Marisol Hernandez, singer, Grammy ® recipient
 Earl Kim, composer
 Leon Kirchner, composer
 Florence LaRue, lead singer of The 5th Dimension
 Howard Leese, rock musician and producer
 Jerry Leiber and Mike Stoller, songwriters and Hall of Fame producers, Grammy ® recipients
 David Liebe Hart, outsider musician, street performer, artist, actor, puppeteer
 George London, opera singer and administrator
 Lebo M, composer
 Les McCann, jazz pianist and singer
 Charles Mingus, jazz musician
 Lennie Niehaus, composer
 Marni Nixon, vocalist
 Odetta, folk singer
 Dianne Reeves, jazz singer, Grammy ® recipient
 Howard Rumsey, jazz musician
 Robin Russell, drummer
 Jack Sheldon, jazz musician
 Leonard Slatkin, conductor, National Medal of Arts recipient
 Ed Thigpen, jazz drummer
 Russ Titelman, music producer, Grammy ® recipient; songwriter
 John Williams, composer, Academy Award ® recipient
 La Monte Young, composer
 Michele Zukovsky, principal and solo clarinetist of the Los Angeles Philharmonic
Sikiru Ayinde Barrister, Fuji singer

Writing
 Byron Barton, author and illustrator
 Kurt Boone, author and poet
 Charles Bukowski, poet and author
 Ed Bullins, playwright, Obie Award recipient
 Leonard Buschel, writer, founder of film festival and addiction and recovery organization
 Carlos Castaneda, author
 Charles Eastman, playwright and screenwriter
 Charles Gordone, playwright, Pulitzer Prize recipient; actor, Obie Award recipient; director
 Jim Harmon, author and producer
 Michael S. Harper, poet, former Poet Laureate of Rhode Island
 Bryan Malessa, author
 Terry McMillan, author
 David Meltzer, poet, musician and educator
 Alejandro Murguía, poet, current Poet Laureate of San Francisco
 Pat Parker, poet and activist
 Judith Reisman, conservative writer
 Carolyn See, author and educator
 Justin Tanner, playwright
 Quincy Troupe, poet; former Poet Laureate of California

Law
 John Branca, music attorney, Co-Executor of the Michael Jackson Estate
 Albert L. Gordon, lawyer and gay rights advocate

Public service

Military

 Susan Ahn Cuddy, U.S. Navy, First Asian-American Female Navy Officer, First Female gunnery officer, WWII
 Joseph A. Czyzyk, U.S. Navy Veteran and Aviation Executive
 Eugene L. Hudson, (Ret.), U. S. Air Force
 Herbert R. Temple, Jr. (Ret.), Chief of the National Guard Bureau

Elected officials

 Jo Anne Darcy, Santa Clarita Mayor and City Council member (deceased)
 Hal Bernson, Los Angeles City Council member
 Howard Caldwell, City manager of Compton, CA, retired
 Tom LaBonge, Los Angeles City Council member
 Louis R. Nowell, Los Angeles City Council member (former)
 Bernard C. Parks, Los Angeles City Council member and former Chief of Police
 Arthur K. Snyder, Los Angeles City Council member, lawyer
 Diane Watson, Member of Congress

Judiciary
 Lourdes Baird, U. S. District Court (Ret.)
 Leo Holt, Cook County (IL) Circuit Court (Ret.)
 Vaino Spencer, Los Angeles County Superior Court, co-founded the Black Women Lawyers Association and the National Association of Women Judges, deceased

Religion
 Robert Sirico, Roman Catholic priest, founder of the Acton Institute

Science
 Robert B. Leighton, Astrophysicist, Rumsford Prize and James Craig Watson Medal Recipient
 Seymour Liebergot, former NASA Flight Controller during the Apollo program
 Lawrence H. Johnston, physicist

Sports

Baseball
 Emmett Ashford, baseball umpire
 Dennis Gilbert, LACC Hall of Fame baseball inductee, sports agent and entrepreneur

Basketball
 Larry Friend, professional basketball player

Football
 Kermit Alexander, professional football player
 Homer Butler, professional football player
 Don Bishop, professional football player
 Ron Botchan, football coach
 Milt Davis, professional football player
 Mike Douglass, former NFL player
 Vince Evans, professional football player
 Reggie Haynes, professional football player
 Woodley Lewis, professional football player
 Rod Martin, former All-Pro player Oakland Raiders
 Jaelan Phillips, professional football player
 Harry Thompson, football player

Track
 Jeff Williams, sprinter

Wrestling
 José "Pepper" Gomez, professional wrestler and bodybuilder

References

Los Angeles City College
Los Angeles City College